Richard Collin (1626, Luxembourg – 1698, Brussels), was an engraver from Luxembourg.

Biography
According to the RKD he was a pupil of Joachim von Sandrart in Rome, and became a master in the Antwerp Guild of St. Luke in 1650–1651. He worked in Rome and in Antwerp, and is known for portraits he engraved for Cornelis de Bie's book of artists called Het Gulden Cabinet. In the 1660s he took on pupils, and in 1678 he moved to Brussels and became the court engraver for Charles II of Spain. His engraving of Christina, Queen of Sweden is held in the Victoria and Albert Museum.

References

Further reading
 Engravings in Sandrart's Teutsche Academie

1626 births
1698 deaths
17th-century engravers
Flemish engravers
People from Luxembourg City
Painters from Antwerp